Parelliptis sporochlora is a moth in the family Lecithoceridae. It was described by Edward Meyrick in 1929. It is found in Sri Lanka.

The wingspan is about 17 mm. The forewings are pale ochreous, with thinly scattered dark fuscous scales and some ochreous-whitish suffusion towards the costa anteriorly, the base of the costal edge is black. The discal stigmata are small and black and there are some slight fuscous irroration (sprinkling) towards the termen. The hindwings are whitish grey.

References

Moths described in 1929
Parelliptis